Petron, also known as Petronas, was an ancient Greek physician from the island of Aegina. He lived later than Hippocrates, and before Herophilus and Erasistratus, so most probably around the middle of the fourth century B.C. He have written a work on pharmacy. 
He was famous for the fever treatment. 

He is also mentioned in one of Galen's work.

References

4th-century Greek physicians